Terje Leonardsen (born 23 December 1976) is a Norwegian football striker.

He started his career in Tveit IL, and also played for IL Flint before joining IK Start. He got ten Norwegian Premier League games in 1996, scoring two goals. Start then spent several seasons in the First Division, but was promoted after the 1999 season, as Leonardsen scored the decisive goal. He scored 7 goals in 24 Premier League games in 2000, despite having contracted TWAR in the summer. In 2002 he scored 4 goals in 15 games, before leaving in the summer, citing disappointment with the new head coach Guðjón Þórðarson. An agreement was soon made with Sandefjord Fotball, who loaned Leonardsen for the remainder of the season.

He returned to Start for the 2003 season, but after the season he left to become playing head coach of Tveit, then a fifth-tier club. In 2008, he joined FK Donn.

References

Norwegian footballers
IK Start players
Sandefjord Fotball players
1976 births
Living people
Association football forwards